"Closer to You" is a song recorded by American country music singer Carly Pearce. It was released in November 2018 as the first single from her self-titled second studio album. The song was written by Hillary Lindsey, Gordie Sampson and Troy Verges.

Charts

Weekly charts

Year-end charts

References

2018 singles
2018 songs
Carly Pearce songs
Big Machine Records singles
Songs written by Hillary Lindsey
Songs written by Gordie Sampson
Songs written by Troy Verges
Song recordings produced by busbee